Yinzhou is a district of the major city of Ningbo, Zhejiang province, China.

History 

In 220 BC, Qin Shi Huang, the first emperor of the Qin dynasty, established three counties called Yin, Mao  and Gouzhang. Later they were merged into Gouzhang county during the Sui dynasty. It was renamed Mao county during the Tang dynasty. It had assumed its current name of "Yin" in the Five Dynasties and Ten Kingdoms period. The city of Ningbo was administrated by Yin county until after the establishment of the People's Republic of China. At the same time, Yin county became a county of Ningbo city. On April 19, 2002, it was renamed Yinzhou District. It is one of the few counties that has kept the same name since its establishment more than 2000 years ago.

Administrative divisions
Subdistricts:
Shounan Subdistrict, Meixu Subdistrict, Shiqi Subdistrict, Xiaying Subdistrict, Zhonggongmiao Subdistrict, Zhonghe Subdistrict

Towns:
Dongqianhu, Dongqiao, Dongwu, Gulin, Gaoqiao, Hengxi, Hengjie, Jitugang, Jiangshan, Qiu'ai, Tangxi, Wuxiang, Xianxiang, Yinjiang, Yunlong, Zhanqi, Zhangshui

The only township is Longguan Township

Historical personalities
 Cheng Duanli, educator
 Tong Dizhou, embryologist

Tourism 

 East Zhejiang Maritime Affairs and Folk Customs Museum, housed in a former temple of Mazu and guildhall in central Ningbo, preserves the area's rich history of traditional arts and maritime trade.
Ningbo Museum is designed by Wang Shu, the first Chinese citizen to win the Pritzker Architecture Prize in 2012. The museum focuses on Ningbo area history and traditional customs.
 Liangzhu Cultural Park was built to commemorate the beautiful love story of Liang Shanbo and Zhu Yingtai. The story is based on the Chinese legend of the Butterfly Lovers.
 Tiantong Scenic Spot mainly consists of Tiantong Temple and Tiantong National Forest Park. Tiantong Temple is one of the most important Chan Buddhist temples; Sōtō began its formation there under Rujing. It was originally built during the Western Jin dynasty around 300 AD (some date it between 265 and 316). It ranks second among the five sacred Chinese Zen Buddhist mountains. A very large complex of buildings, its former total of 999 rooms has now shrunk to 730 today, arranged in twenty groups of buildings rising up the mountain slope.
 Eyuwang Temple was built in A.D. 232. It is the only existing temple named after Ashoka in China.
 Dongqian Lake lies in the southeast of Yinzhou District. It is the largest natural freshwater lake in Zhejiang province, with a water surface area of 20 square kilometers. Since ancient times, the Lake has been a famous scenic spot in Eastern Zhejiang.
 Romon U-Park is one of the largest urban indoor amusement parks in the world.

Industry 
Yinzhou District is home to more than 15,000 industrial organizations. The economy mainly consists of six sectors: light textiles, garments, machinery, electronics, automobile parts and food. In 2008, its GDP reached RMB 65.08 billion yuan and per capita GDP reached RMB 82,052 yuan (US$11,815). Its imports and exports totaled US$1.44 billion and US$6.6 billion, respectively.

Economy 
Ningbo Southern Business District ("Ningbo CBD") is located in the district. AUX Group and Yinzhou Bank are based in Yinzhou district.

Education 
Ningbo Higher Education Zone is located at the south of Yinzhou District. Educational institutions located in the Higher Educational Zone:
Ningbo Institute of Technology
University of Nottingham Ningbo China
Yinzhou Education Center
Zhejiang University and Ningbo University Hygiene Vocational School 
Zhejiang Wanli University

International schools in Yinzhou:
HD Ningbo School Yinzhou Campus
Ningbo Huamao International School

External links 
鄞州区人民政府网站 Government of Yinzhou District Website

References

 
Geography of Ningbo
Districts of Zhejiang